Idris Gwyn Jones (born 13 October 1939) is a South African pair skater. With partner Marcelle Matthews, he represented South Africa at the 1960 Winter Olympics where he placed 13th.

References

South African pair skaters
1939 births
Living people
Olympic figure skaters of South Africa
Figure skaters at the 1960 Winter Olympics